Association Sportive des Forces Armées Royales, commonly known as AS FAR or FAR Rabat, is a professional basketball club based in Morocco's capital (Rabat-Salé). It is part of the multi-sports club with the same name, its first team plays in the Division Excellence, the country's first-level league.

The basketball team was founded in 1959 and has won the Moroccan championship three times (in 1964, 1969, 1986).

Honours

Domestic competitions 
Division Excellence
Champions (3): 1964, 1969, 1986
Moroccan Throne Cup
Winners (2): 1987, 2021
Runners-up (4):  1977, 1978, 1983, 1988

International competitions 
FIBA Africa Clubs Champions Cup
 Third place (1): 2015

References

Basketball teams in Morocco
Salé
Sport in Rabat
Basketball teams established in 1959